"The Last to Know" is a song recorded by Sheena Easton for her 1987 album, No Sound But a Heart. It was written by Brock Walsh and Phil Galdston and produced by Nick Martinelli. In 1990, it was covered by Celine Dion.

Celine Dion version

Canadian singer Celine Dion covered "The Last to Know" for her first English-language album, Unison (1990). The song was released by Columbia Records as the album's fourth single in Canada on 11 March 1991. Later, it was issued as a single in the rest of the world. The song was written by Brock Walsh and Phil Galdston, and originally recorded by Sheena Easton in 1987. Dion's version was produced by Christopher Neil.

After its release, "The Last to Know" received positive reviews from music critics. The song peaked at number sixteen in Canada and number seven on the Canadian Adult Contemporary chart. It also reached number twenty-two on the US Hot Adult Contemporary Tracks. The accompanying music video for the song was directed by Dominic Orlando. Dion performed "The Last to Know" during her Unison Tour.

Background and release
"The Last to Know" was one of three covers recorded by Dion for her English-language album, Unison. Dion's version was produced by British record producer, Christopher Neil. It was released as the fourth single in Canada on 11 March 1991 and third single in the United States (June 1991) and the rest of the world (September 1991). In the United Kingdom, it was the second single, after "Where Does My Heart Beat Now". "The Last to Know"'s B-side included "Unison" (Remix) in the United States and the album version of "Unison" in the rest of the world.

Critical reception
Larry Flick from Billboard noted that Dion "returns to familiar ballad territory" and described it as a "lovely tune". Entertainment Weekly editor Jim Farber wrote, "Tracks like "If Love Is Out the Question" and "The Last to Know" are lush vehicles, filled with routine hooks that Dion's distinctive voice raises to a higher level". Christopher Smith from TalkAboutPopMusic described it as a "slow and sensual ballad full of atmosphere and synth-based backing tracks."

Commercial performance
In Canada, "The Last to Know" entered the RPM Top Singles chart on 16 March 1991 and peaked at number 16 on 25 May 1991. The song also entered RPM Adult Contemporary chart on 23 March 1991 and reached number seven there. In the United States, "The Last to Know" debuted on Billboards Adult Contemporary chart dated 13 July 1991 and peaked at number 22 on 31 August 1991.

Live performances
Dion performed "The Last to Know" on The Tonight Show in March 1991, and also during her 1990–91 Unison Tour.

Track listings and formatsAustralian cassette, CD / Japanese 3" single"The Last to Know" – 4:34
"Unison" – 4:12Canadian cassette / European 7", cassette single"The Last to Know" (Edit) – 4:18
"Unison" – 4:12European CD single"The Last to Know" (Edit) – 4:18
"Unison" – 4:12
"If We Could Start Over" – 4:23US 7", cassette single'
"The Last to Know" (Edit) – 4:18
"Unison" (Remix) – 4:04

Charts

Weekly charts

Year-end charts

Credits and personnel
Recording
Recorded at West Side Studios, London

Personnel
Celine Dion – lead vocals
Christopher Neil – producer, backing vocals
Brock Walsh – songwriter
Phil Galdston – songwriter
Steve Pigott – keyboards, bass, drums, percussion
Alan Carvell – backing vocals
Linda Taylor – backing vocals
Simon Hurrell – engineer

Release history

References

External links
 

1987 songs
1990 songs
1991 singles
Celine Dion songs
Pop ballads
Song recordings produced by Christopher Neil
Songs written by Phil Galdston